The 1948 Kansas Jayhawks football team represented the University of Kansas in the Big Seven Conference during the 1948 college football season. In their first season under head coach Jules V. Sikes, the Jayhawks compiled a 7–3 record (4–2 against conference opponents), finished third in the Big Seven Conference, and outscored all opponents by a combined total of 199 to 137. They played their home games at Memorial Stadium in Lawrence, Kansas.

On October 9, 1948, the Jayhawks played the 500th game in program history, a 20-7 victory over Iowa State. The team won seven of its first eight games but finished the season with back-to-back losses to Oklahoma and Missouri.

Notable players on the 1948 squad included fullback Forrest Griffith, quarterback Dick Gilman, end Bryan Sperry, tackle Mike McCormack, and guard Dick Tomlinson. Griffith was the team's leading rusher with 368 yards on 96 carries; he was also the leading scorer with 37 points scored on six touchdowns and an extra point.  Gilman was the leading passer with 44 completions on 129 attempts for 945 passing yards, 14 interceptions and 14 touchdown passes.

Schedule

References

Kansas
Kansas Jayhawks football seasons
Kansas Jayhawks football